Nadia Aziz (born 18 February 1973) is a Pakistani politician who was a Member of the Provincial Assembly of the Punjab from 2002 to 2007 and again from May 2013 to May 2018.

Early life and education
Aziz was born on 18 February 1973 in Gujrat.

She completed her college level education from Air Base Inter College in Sargodha. She received the degree of Bachelor of Medicine and Bachelor of Surgery in 1997 from Allama Iqbal Medical College.

Political career

Aziz was elected to the Provincial Assembly of the Punjab as a candidate of Pakistan Peoples Party (PPP) from Constituency PP-34 (Sargodha-VII) in 2002 Pakistani general election. She received 10,904 votes and defeated a candidate of Pakistan Muslim League (Q) (PML-Q). And now she join PTi

She ran for the seat of the Provincial Assembly of the Punjab as a candidate of PPP from Constituency PP-34 (Sargodha-VII) in 2008 Pakistani general election but was unsuccessful. She received 16,723 votes and lost the seat to Rizwan Nowaiz Gill, a candidate of Pakistan Muslim League (N) (PML-N).

Aziz was re-elected to the Provincial Assembly of the Punjab as a candidate of PML-N from Constituency PP-34 (Sargodha-VII) in 2013 Pakistani general election. She received 33,853 votes and defeated Ansar Majeed Khan Niazi, a candidate of Pakistan Tehreek-e-Insaf (PTI).

In May 2018, she quit PML-N and joined PTI.

References

1973 births
Living people
Women members of the Provincial Assembly of the Punjab
Punjab MPAs 2013–2018
Punjab MPAs 2002–2007
Pakistan Muslim League (N) MPAs (Punjab)
Pakistan People's Party MPAs (Punjab)
People from Gujrat, Pakistan
21st-century Pakistani women politicians